Lufwanyama District with headquarters at Lufwanyama is a large rural undeveloped district in the west of Copperbelt Province. On a number of maps it is mixed up with Mpongwe District and Masaiti District. At one time these three districts were known as 'Ndola Rural'. As of the 2010 Zambian Census, the district had a population of 78,503 people.

With an area of 9849 square kilometres, Lufwanyama District is currently the biggest district in Zambia.

References

Districts of Copperbelt Province